= Korea women's national football team =

Korea women's national football team may refer to:

- North Korea women's national football team, the association football team representing North Korea
- South Korea women's national football team, the association football team representing South Korea
